Afrden Asqer (born 15 September 2003) is an ethnic Uyghur Chinese footballer currently playing as a forward for Guangzhou.

Club career

Early career
Born in Kashgar, Xinjiang, trained in Xi'an, Shaanxi, Asqer played for Shaanxi Laochenggen until 2017, when he moved to Japan to sign for Shimizu S-Pulse. While in Japan, he also played for Kashima Antlers.

In 2018, he returned to China to join the youth ranks of Guangzhou. Asqer went on to represent the China under-19 and under-20 teams in the China League Two in 2020 and 2021.

2021 season
While also representing the China under-20 select in League Two, Asqer also played for Suzhou Dongwu in League One, again on loan from Guangzhou.

Career statistics

Club
.

References

2003 births
Living people
Sportspeople from Xi'an
Footballers from Shaanxi
Chinese footballers
China youth international footballers
Chinese expatriate footballers
Association football forwards
China League Two players
China League One players
Chinese Super League players
Shimizu S-Pulse players
Kashima Antlers players
Guangzhou F.C. players
Suzhou Dongwu F.C. players
Chinese expatriate sportspeople in Japan
Expatriate footballers in Japan
Chinese Muslims
21st-century Chinese people
Uyghur sportspeople